Yellowstone Christian College is a four-year, confessional Christian liberal arts college with 2 campuses in Billings, Montana and Kalispell, Montana. The college is affiliated with the Montana Southern Baptist Convention. Founded in 1974, it was called Yellowstone Baptist College until 2010.

Overview
YCC is a member of the Association for Biblical Higher Education (ABHE, Orlando). YCC is authorized by the Montana University System (MUS) and the US Department of Education (DOE). YCC is recognized by the Council on Higher Education Accreditation (CHEA).

YCC offers Associate of Arts degrees in Christian Leadership, Associate of Science degrees in Business and Exercise Science, Bachelor of Arts in Christian Leadership, and Bachelor of Science degrees in Sports Management and Business.

Collegiate basketball began in 2015 with the men's team and 2016 with the women's teams.

YCC offers student housing and meal plans. The YCC library contains 20,000+ volumes and is housed in a 8,000 square foot building.  The William S. and Laura Jean Phillips Auditorium seats 220, housing classrooms and the dining hall.

References

External links

Seminaries and theological colleges in Montana
Buildings and structures in Billings, Montana
Education in Yellowstone County, Montana
Universities and colleges affiliated with the Southern Baptist Convention